The name invalid is reserved by the Internet Engineering Task Force (IETF) in RFC 2606 (June 1999) as a domain name that may not be installed as a top-level domain in the Domain Name System (DNS) of the Internet.

Reserved DNS names

The reasons for reservation of these top-level domain names is to reduce the likelihood of conflict and confusion. This allows the use of these names for either documentation purposes or in local testing scenarios.

Purpose
This top-level domain is sometimes used as a pseudo domain name in Uniform Resource Identifiers (URIs) to convey either an error condition or in use of privacy protection. A notable instance of this usage is in the Session Initiation Protocol (SIP) where the domain name  in a SIP URI indicates hiding of a caller's identity.

References

Top-level domains
Internet properties established in 1999
Computer-related introductions in 1999

ja:トップレベルドメイン#特殊用途
sv:Toppdomän#Generiska toppdomäner